George Augustus Waggaman (1782March 31, 1843) was a United States Senator from Louisiana. Born in Caroline County, Maryland, he completed preparatory studies under private tutors, studied law, and was admitted to the bar in Caroline County in 1811. He served in the War of 1812 under General Andrew Jackson at New Orleans and settled in Baton Rouge, Louisiana, commencing the practice of law in 1813. He was attorney general of the third district of Louisiana in 1813, judge of the third judicial circuit court in 1818, and assistant judge of the criminal court in New Orleans in 1819. He was interested in sugarcane growing and held the office of Secretary of State of Louisiana from 1830 to 1831.

Waggaman was elected as an anti-Jacksonian to the U.S. Senate to fill the vacancy caused by the resignation of Edward Livingston and served from November 15, 1831, to March 4, 1835. He resumed the practice of law in New Orleans and again engaged in sugar cane planting. He participated as a principal in a duel with the former mayor of New Orleans, Denis Prieur, a political adversary, and received injuries from which he died in New Orleans in 1843; interment was in Girod Street Cemetery.

In 1840, Waggaman's daughter Christine eloped with a young Canadian lawyer, John Sandfield Macdonald, who made regular trips to Washington on behalf of the government of Upper Canada as Queen's messenger. She joined Macdonald in Upper Canada. He would go on to be joint Premier of the Province of Canada and the first Premier of Ontario.

References

Sources

External links

|-

1782 births
1843 deaths
19th-century American judges
19th-century American lawyers
American politicians killed in duels
Deaths by firearm in Louisiana
Farmers from Louisiana
Louisiana lawyers
Louisiana National Republicans
Louisiana state court judges
National Republican Party United States senators
People from Caroline County, Maryland
Secretaries of State of Louisiana
United States Army personnel of the War of 1812
United States senators from Louisiana